Myawady Football Club is a Burmese football club. Myawady FC currently plays in MNL-2.

2017 Players Squad

References

External links
 First Eleven Journal in Burmese
 Soccer Myanmar in Burmese

Myanmar National League